The 2012 Copa Sudamericana de Clubes (officially the 2012 Copa Bridgestone Sudamericana de Clubes for sponsorship reasons) was the 11th edition of the Copa Sudamericana, South America's secondary international club football tournament organized by CONMEBOL. The tournament was expanded from 39 teams to 47 teams, allowing the eight associations other than Argentina and Brazil to each enter four teams instead of three teams. Universidad de Chile were the defending champions, but lost to eventual champion, São Paulo in the quarterfinals.

Brazilian club São Paulo were crowned as the champion after defeating Argentine club Tigre in the finals. Having already qualified for the 2013 Libertadores Cup (for being 4th in the 2012 Brazilian League), São Paulo, after winning the 2012 Sudamericana Cup, will also dispute the 2013 Recopa Cup (Championship played between the Libertadores Cup champion and the Sudamericana Cup champion) and the 2013 Suruga Cup.

Qualified teams

Draw
The draw was held on June 29, 2012 (postponed from original date of June 26), 12:00 UTC−04:00 at CONMEBOL's Convention Center in Luque, Paraguay.

The tournament is played in single-elimination format, with each tie played over two legs. The draw mechanism was as follows:
First Stage
The 32 teams from the eight countries other than Argentina and Brazil, excluding the defending champion, were drawn against each other. The teams were divided into South Zone (Chile, Uruguay, Paraguay, Bolivia) and North Zone (Colombia, Ecuador, Peru, Venezuela). Teams which qualified through berths 1 were drawn against teams which qualified through berths 4, and teams which qualified through berths 2 were drawn against teams which qualified through berths 3, with the former playing the second leg at home.
Second Stage
The 16 winners of the First Stage were drawn against each other, where a winner from the South Zone were drawn against a winner from the North Zone.
The 6 teams from Argentina were drawn against each other, where the matchups were based on the berths which the teams qualify through: 1 v 6, 2 v 5, 3 v 4, with the former playing the second leg at home.
The 8 teams from Brazil were drawn against each other, where the matchups were based on the berths which the teams qualify through: 1 v 8, 2 v 7, 3 v 6, 4 v 5, with the former playing the second leg at home.
Final stages
The 15 winners of the Second Stage, together with the defending champion, were assigned a "seed" starting from the round of 16 (the defending champion and the winners from Argentina and Brazil were assigned even "seeds", the winners from the other eight countries were assigned odd "seeds"). The "seeding" was used to determine the bracket of the final stages, with the higher-seeded team playing the second leg at home in each tie.

Schedule
All dates listed are Wednesdays, but matches may be played on the day before (Tuesdays) and after (Thursdays) as well.

Preliminary stages

The first two stages of the competition are the First Stage and Second Stage. Both stages are largely played concurrent to each other.

First stage
The First Stage began on July 24 and ended on August 23. Team 1 played the second leg at home.

|-
!colspan=6|South Zone

|-
!colspan=6|North Zone

|}

Second stage
The Second Stage began on July 31 and ended on September 20.

|}

Final stages

Teams from the Round of 16 onwards are seeded depending on which second stage tie they won (i.e., the winner of Match O1 would be assigned the 1 seed, etc.; the defending champion, Universidad de Chile, was assigned the 10 seed).

Bracket
In each tie, the higher-seeded team played the second leg at home.

Round of 16
The Round of 16 began on September 25 and ended on October 25. Team 1 played the second leg at home.

|-

|}

Quarterfinals
The Quarterfinals began on October 30 and ended on November 15. Team 1 played the second leg at home.

|-

|}

Semifinals
The Semifinals began on November 22 and ended on November 29. Team 1 played the second leg at home.

|-

|}

Finals

The Finals were played over two legs, with the higher-seeded team playing the second leg at home. If the teams were tied on points and goal difference at the end of regulation in the second leg, the away goals rule would not be applied and 30 minutes of extra time would be played. If still tied after extra time, the title would be decided by penalty shootout.

São Paulo won on points 4–1.

Top goalscorers

Awards

Player of the week

See also
Libertadores
Recopa
Suruga

References

External links
Official webpage 

 
2
2012